In the Power of the Hypnotist is a 1913 American silent film produced by Gene Gauntier Feature Players and distributed by Warner's Features. It was directed by Sidney Olcott with himself, Gene Gauntier and Jack J. Clark in the leading roles.

Cast
 Sidney Olcott as Gondorza
 Gene Gauntier as Gondorza's Daughter
 Jack J. Clark as The Detective

Production notes
 The film was shot in Jacksonville, Fla.

External links

 In the Power of the Hypnotist website dedicated to Sidney Olcott

1913 films
Silent American drama films
American silent short films
Films shot in Jacksonville, Florida
Films directed by Sidney Olcott
1913 short films
1913 drama films
American black-and-white films
1910s American films
1910s English-language films
American drama short films